Winterton may refer to:

Places

England 
Winterton, Lincolnshire, a small town in North Lincolnshire, England
Winterton Hospital in County Durham
in Norfolk:
Winterton Dunes, a nature reserve
Winterton Ness, an area of foreland on the North Norfolk coast of England.
Winterton-on-Sea, a village and civil parish
location of Winterton Lighthouse

Canada 
Winterton, Newfoundland and Labrador, a town in the Canadian province of Newfoundland and Labrador

South Africa 
Winterton, KwaZulu-Natal, a small town in KwaZulu-Natal

United States 
Winterton, former name of Altaville, California
Winterton, New York, a town in Sullivan County, New York, United States

People
Winterton (surname)

Other
Earl Winterton, a title in the Peerage of Ireland
HMS Coromandel (1795), a ship formerly the East Indiaman Winterton